In geometry, the pseudo great rhombicuboctahedron is one of the two pseudo uniform polyhedra, the other being the convex elongated square gyrobicupola or pseudo rhombicuboctahedron. It has the same vertex figure as the nonconvex great rhombicuboctahedron (a uniform polyhedron), but is not a uniform polyhedron (due to not being isogonal), and has a smaller symmetry group. It is related to the nonconvex great rhombicuboctahedron in the same way that the pseudo rhombicuboctahedron is related to the rhombicuboctahedron.

Related polyhedra
The pseudo-great rhombicuboctahedron may also be termed an elongated crossed square gyrobicupola, in analogy to the name of the elongated square gyrobicupola.

References
.

External links
George Hart - Pseudo Rhombicuboctahedra
 
Pseudo-uniform polyhedra